Porferio Tirador "Gopher" Armstrong (May 8, 1935 – March 17, 2010), sometimes called Theodore Armstrong, was a Cheyenne-Caddo painter from Clinton, Oklahoma. Armstrong had a keen interest in art since elementary school. He studied at the Concho Indian School and has exhibited his work across the country. Some of his works are in the permanent collection of institutions including the Oklahoma Historical Society Museum and the Joslyn Art Museum.

Armstrong served in the United States Marine Corps for three years during WWII. He married Dola Jean Tartsah (from the Kiowa tribe) in 1961. He died on March 17, 2010, and is buried in the Concho Cemetery, Concho, Oklahoma.

References 

1935 births
2010 deaths
20th-century American painters
20th-century indigenous painters of the Americas
Native American painters
Painters from Oklahoma
Cheyenne people
Caddoan peoples